Josephine "Josie" MacAvin (1919 – 26 January 2005) was an Irish set decorator and art director. She won an Academy Award and was nominated two more times in the category Best Art Direction. She also won a Primetime Emmy Award for Outstanding Individual Achievement in Art Direction for a Miniseries or a Special for her work as set dresser on the miniseries Scarlett (1994). MacAvin's Oscar and Emmy statuettes are both on permanent display at the Irish Film Institute, Dublin.

Life and career
MacAvin was the daughter of John Patrick MacAvin

(1881/82–1938) and Mollie MacAvin (née Callaghan; d. 1992). Upon her death, Josie left an estate worth €2,616,230.

MacAvin began in showbusiness as a ballerina, performing with the Irish Ballet Club at the Gate Theatre in 1943. In the 1950s she was stage director and company manager of the Dublin Players, who toured the U.S. with plays by Sean O'Casey, George Bernard Shaw and Lennox Robinson.

MacAvin's film work spanned six decades, beginning her film career as set decorator with Shake Hands with the Devil (1959), filmed in Dublin and at Ardmore Studios, Bray.

Selected filmography
MacAvin won an Academy Award for Best Art Direction and was nominated for two more:
Won
 Out of Africa (1985)
Nominated
 The Spy Who Came in from the Cold (1965)
 Tom Jones (1963)

References

External links

Set decorators
Best Art Direction Academy Award winners
1919 births
2005 deaths
Burials at Glasnevin Cemetery
Primetime Emmy Award winners